Michael Okoro may refer to:

Michael Okoro, drummer with The Cats (reggae band), which produced a few singles in 1968
Michael Nnachi Okoro (born 1940), Bishop of the Roman Catholic Diocese of Abakaliki